Nnamdi Obukwelu (born April 13, 1991) is a former American football defensive tackle.

College career
Obukwelu was a standout at Harvard University playing on the defensive line, primarily as a defensive tackle, and winning two Ivy League Championships while at Harvard. A three time All-Ivy selection, in 2013 he was tabbed as the winner of the George "Bulger" Lowe Award, awarded to New England's top defensive player. He graduated from Harvard with a degree in economics.

Professional career
On May 13, 2014, Obukwelu was signed to an undrafted free agent contract with the Indianapolis Colts. He was released in August and then resigned to the practice squad on September 1, 2014. Three weeks later, Obukwelu was released after agreeing on an injury settlement. Obukwelu was featured on the NFL Network Show "Undrafted".

References

External links
Indianapolis Colts Bio 
Harvard Crimson Bio 

1991 births
Living people
Harvard Crimson football players
American football defensive tackles
Boston College High School alumni
American people of Igbo descent
Igbo sportspeople
American sportspeople of Nigerian descent
Indianapolis Colts players
American football defensive linemen